Chip Long (born May 1, 1983) is an American football coach. He previously was the offensive coordinator for Tulane University, the University of Notre Dame, and the University of Memphis and Georgia Tech.

Coaching career

Early coaching career
Long began his coaching career as a graduate assistant at Louisville, where he held the position for two years. This was followed by two years as a graduate assistant at Arkansas. In 2010 and 2011 Long worked as Illinois' tight ends and fullbacks coach.

In 2012, Long went to Arizona State to coach the Sun Devils tight ends while also serving as the recruiting coordinator. Long followed Mike Norvell from Arizona State to Memphis Tigers to serve as offensive coordinator under Norvell in 2016.

Notre Dame
After one season at Memphis, Long left to become offensive coordinator for Notre Dame. Long was a finalist for the 2018 Broyles Award, which is given to the nation's top assistant coach, after the Irish finished the regular season undefeated, and had secured their first appearance in the college football playoffs.

Tennessee
On December 11, 2019, it was announced that Long would not be retained by the University of Notre Dame. In February 2020, Long accepted an off-the-field analyst position at the University of Tennessee.

Tulane
On December 8, 2020, Tulane announced the addition of Long as offensive coordinator.

Georgia Tech
On December 5, 2021, Georgia Tech announced Long was hired to become the new offensive coordinator for coach Geoff Collins and the Yellow Jackets. Additionally he originally was supposed to be the quarterbacks coach, but he then was transitioned to the team’s tight ends coach. Collins was fired midway through the 2022 season, and Long was released from his contract by new head coach Brent Key.

References

External links
 Georgia Tech profile

1983 births
Living people
American football tight ends
American football wide receivers
Arizona State Sun Devils football coaches
Arkansas Razorbacks football coaches
Georgia Tech Yellow Jackets football coaches
Illinois Fighting Illini football coaches
Louisville Cardinals football coaches
Memphis Tigers football coaches
North Alabama Lions football players
Notre Dame Fighting Irish football coaches
Tennessee Volunteers football coaches
Tulane Green Wave football coaches